Ilex vomitoria, commonly known as yaupon or yaupon holly, is a species of holly that is native to southeastern North America. The word yaupon was derived from the Catawban yą́pą, from yą- tree + pą leaf.  Another common name, cassina, was borrowed from Timucua (despite this, it usually refers to Ilex cassine). The Latin name comes from an observation by early Europeans that the ingestion of the plant was followed by vomiting in certain ceremonies.

The plant was traditionally used by Native Americans to make an infusion containing caffeine. It is only one of two known plants endemic to North America that produce caffeine. The other (containing 80% less) is Ilex cassine, commonly known as dahoon holly.  Yaupon is also widely used for landscaping in its native range.

Description
Yaupon holly is an evergreen shrub or small tree reaching 5–9 m tall, with smooth, light gray bark and slender, hairy shoots. The leaf arrangement is alternate, with leaves ovate to elliptical and a rounded apex with crenate or coarsely serrated margin, 1–4.5 cm long and 1–2 cm broad, glossy dark green above, slightly paler below. The flowers are 5–5.5 mm diameter, with a white four-lobed corolla. The fruit is a small round, shiny, and red (occasionally yellow) drupe 4–6 mm diameter containing four pits, which are dispersed by birds eating the fruit. The species may be distinguished from the similar Ilex cassine by its smaller leaves with a rounded, not acute apex.

Habitat and range
I. vomitoria occurs in the United States from the Eastern Shore of Virginia south to Florida and west to Oklahoma and Texas. A disjunct population occurs in the Mexican state of Chiapas. It generally occurs in coastal areas in well-drained sandy soils, and can be found on the upper edges of brackish and salt marshes, sandy hammocks, coastal sand dunes, inner-dune depressions, sandhills, maritime forests, nontidal forested wetlands, well-drained forests and pine flatwoods.

Ecology

The fruit are an important food for many birds, including Florida duck, American black duck, mourning dove, ruffed grouse, bobwhite quail, wild turkey, northern flicker, sapsuckers, cedar waxwing, eastern bluebird, American robin, gray catbird, northern mockingbird, and white-throated sparrow. Mammals that eat the fruit include nine-banded armadillo, American black bear, gray fox, raccoon and skunks. The foliage and twigs are browsed by white-tailed deer.

Cultivation and uses

Human consumption

Some Native American tribes brew the leaves and stems to create an herbal tea, commonly called black drink. Historically the ceremonial consumption often included vomiting, and Europeans deduced that yaupon caused it (hence the Latin name - Ilex vomitoria). The active ingredients, like those of the related yerba mate and guayusa plants, are caffeine, theobromine, and theophylline; the vomiting may have resulted from the great quantities in which they drank the beverage, coupled with fasting. 

Native Americans may have also used the infusion as a laxative. Ilex vomitoria usage by colonists for tea making and for medicinal uses in the Carolinas is documented by the early 18th century. In the English-speaking colonies, it was known variously as cassina, yaupon tea, Indian tea, Carolina tea, and Appalachian tea. Recently, the process of drying the leaves for consumption has been adopted by modern Americans, and yaupon is now commercially available.

Ornamental
Ilex vomitoria is a common landscape plant in the Southeastern United States.  The most common cultivars are slow-growing shrubs popular for their dense, evergreen foliage and their adaptability to pruning into hedges of various shapes. These include:
'Folsom Weeping' – weeping cultivar
'Grey's Littleleaf'/'Grey's Weeping' – weeping cultivar
'Nana'/'Compacta' – dwarf female clone usually remaining below 1 m in height.
'Pride of Houston' – female clone similar to type but featuring improvements in form, fruiting, and foliage.
'Schilling's Dwarf'/'Stokes Dwarf' – dwarf male clone that grows no more than 0.6 m tall and 1.2 m wide.
'Will Fleming' – male clone featuring a columnar growth habit.
'Pendula' – "weeping" variety. Has the highest caffeine content.

See also
 Ilex paraguariensis or  – a caffeinated holly native to subtropical South America.
 Ilex guayusa or guayusa – a caffeinated holly native to the Ecuadorian Amazon Rainforest.
 Kuding – a Chinese tisane made from I. kudingcha
 Yaupon Beach, North Carolina - a former town and current neighborhood of Oak Island, North Carolina.

References

vomitoria
Plants described in 1789
Caffeine
Herbal and fungal stimulants
Plants used in traditional Native American medicine
Trees of Chiapas
Trees of the Southeastern United States
Trees of the South-Central United States
Emetics
Plants used in bonsai